Indian Wild Ass Sanctuary also known as the Wild Ass Wildlife Sanctuary is located in the Little Rann of Kutch in the Gujarat state of India. It is spread over an area of 4954 km².

The wildlife sanctuary was established in 1972 and came under the Wildlife Protection Act of 1972. The sanctuary is one of the last places on earth where the endangered wild ass sub-species Indian Wild Ass (Khur) (Equus hemionus khur) belonging to Asiatic Wild Ass species Onager (Equus hemionus) can be spotted.

Geography
The Rann of Kutch is a sealine desert. During monsoon, the Rann (Gujarati for desert) gets flooded for a period of about one month and is dotted with about 74 elevated plateaus or islands, locally called 'bets'. These bets are covered with grass and feed the population of around 2100 animals.

Species found
The sanctuary is habitat to many species of animals and birds. According to the data submitted to the UNESCO World Heritage Centre the sanctuary has

 About 93 species of invertebrates - 25 species of zooplanktons, 1 species of annelid, 4 crustaceans, 24 insects, 12 molluscs and 27 spiders.
 4 species of amphibians
 29 species of reptiles - 2 species of turtles, 14 species of lizards, 12 snakes and 1 crocodile
 Metapenaeus kutchensis - a type of prawn
 70,000-75,000 bird nests
 9 mammalian orders with 33 species/subspecies - including the world’s last population of the Khur sub-species of the wild ass

Threats

The main threat faced by the sanctuary is the illegal salt panning activity in the area. 25% of India's salt supply comes from panning activity in the area.

Biosphere Reserve — World Heritage Site
It is nominated by the Forest department to be a biosphere reserve which are areas of terrestrial and coastal ecosystems internationally recognized within the framework of UNESCO's Man and Biosphere (MAB) programme. It will focus on conserving biological diversity, research, monitoring and providing sustainable development models, the proposal has been sent to and listed at UNESCO.

Wildlife Sanctuaries and Reserves of Kutch
From the city of Bhuj various ecologically rich and wildlife conservation areas of the Kutch / Kachchh district can be visited such as Indian Wild Ass Sanctuary, Kutch Desert Wildlife Sanctuary, Narayan Sarovar Sanctuary, Kutch Bustard Sanctuary, Banni Grasslands Reserve and Chari-Dhand Wetland Conservation Reserve etc..

Gallery

See also

List of national parks and wildlife sanctuaries of Gujarat, India

References

Further reading
Wild asses population rises by 4%; TNN; 11 April 2009; Times of India
Wild Ass vulnerable to flu; by TNN; 9 April 2009; Times of India
Wild ass census to kick off from April 5; TNN; 31 March 2009; Times of India
Bleak future for traditional salt; by Anosh Malekar; February 21, 2009; Courtesy : Infochange News & Features; ComodittyOnline
Wild ass robs agarias' livelihood; February 15, 2007; Rediff India Abroad
Indian Wild Ass Sanctuary; SANCTUARY SPOTLIGHT; Mar 04, 2006; The Hindu, Online edition of India's National Newspaper. Also posted at Indian Wild Ass Sanctuary
Wild ass population shows upward trend; TNN; 3 April 2004; Times of India
Japanese duo does donkey work in Rann - ‘‘The female donkeys are left by the maldhari’s on the island of Plaswa village in the Rann of Kutch for about three months during the monsoon. Here, the Wild Ass, a protected species, breed with the female donkeys leading to the birth of hybrid donkeys which are taller than their mothers and wilder than their fathers,’’ says Dr R Kimura who has been a visiting researcher at the Equine Museum of Japan for the past two decades.; by Rupam Jain; November 3, 2003; Indian Express Newspaper. Also see 
Officials gear up for wild ass census; by TNN;  28 November 2003; Times of India
Wild ass being robbed of its run of the Little Rann; by ANAND SUNDAS; March 8, 1999; Indian Express Newspaper

External links

Wild ASS Sanctuary & Wild Life - National Parks & Wildlife Sanctuaries - Wild ASS Sanctuary; Official website: Forests & Environment Department; State Government of Gujarat, India

1972 establishments in Gujarat
Protected areas of Kutch district
Wildlife sanctuaries in Gujarat
Protected areas established in 1972
Onager
World Heritage Tentative List for India